Antonio Campolo (born 7 February 1897 – 22 May 1959) was a Uruguayan footballer who played as a forward for Peñarol and the Uruguay national team.

Career statistics

International

References

External links

profile

1897 births
1959 deaths
Uruguayan footballers
Footballers at the 1928 Summer Olympics
Olympic footballers of Uruguay
Olympic gold medalists for Uruguay
Uruguay international footballers
Uruguayan Primera División players
Peñarol players
Olympic medalists in football
Copa América-winning players
Medalists at the 1928 Summer Olympics
Association football forwards